Haberlandia josephi is a moth in the family Cossidae. It is found in the Democratic Republic of Congo. The habitat consists of rainforests.

The wingspan is about 28.5 mm. The forewings are colonial buff with Isabella colour lines from the costal margin towards the dorsum. The hindwings are colonial buff.

Etymology
The species is named in honour of Joseph Mugambi Ruthiiri.

References

Natural History Museum Lepidoptera generic names catalog

Moths described in 2011
Metarbelinae
Taxa named by Ingo Lehmann
Endemic fauna of the Democratic Republic of the Congo